Mark Arnold (25 September 1827 — Q4 1901) was an English first-class cricketer.

The son of James Arnold, a coach builder, he was born at Cambridge in September 1827. His elder brother was Charles, who was a professional cricketer. Arnold appeared in four first-class cricket matches for the Cambridge Town Club from 1848 to 1855. Playing as a bowler, he took 11 wickets and took a five wicket haul on one occasion. Like his brother, he too was engaged as a professional, by teams as far north as Yorkshire and as far south as Dorset. Arnold died at Hackney in the first-quarter of 1901.

References

External links

1827 births
1901 deaths
Cricketers from Cambridgeshire
Sportspeople from Cambridge
English cricketers
Cambridge Town Club cricketers